The Kansas City Southern Railway Locomotive No. 73D and Caboose No. 385 are historic railroad equipment located near Arkansas Highway 59 and Church Street in Decatur, Arkansas.  The locomotive is an EMD F7A built in 1950, and used in service by the Kansas City Southern Railway until 1991, although it was converted to a slug unit sometime in the 1970s and the body was filled with concrete and old wheels.  The caboose was built in 1952 by the Louisiana and Arkansas Railroad, a division of Kansas City Southern, and used in service until 1991.  Both were purchased in 1991 by Peterson Farms, restored, and placed on display near the former Kansas City Southern depot in Decatur.

The locomotive and caboose were listed on the National Register of Historic Places in 2006.

See also
National Register of Historic Places listings in Benton County, Arkansas
Kansas City Southern Railway Caboose No. 383

References

Railway locomotives on the National Register of Historic Places in Arkansas
National Register of Historic Places in Benton County, Arkansas
Electro-Motive Diesel locomotives
Standard gauge locomotives of the United States
Kansas City Southern Railway
Diesel-electric locomotives of the United States
Decatur, Arkansas
Railway vehicles on the National Register of Historic Places in Arkansas
1950 in rail transport
1952 in rail transport
Transportation in Benton County, Arkansas
Cabooses